Helcystogramma flavilineolella is a moth in the family Gelechiidae. It was described by Ponomarenko in 1998. It is found in south-eastern Siberia and China (Henan, Liaoning, Shaanxi, Sichuan, Zhejiang).

The wingspan is 13–16 mm. The forewings are greyish brown, with the costal margin, from the base to three-fourths of its length, and veins light yellow, without spots. The hindwings are brownish grey, darker towards the apex.

References

Moths described in 1998
flavilineolella
Moths of Asia